White garlic may refer to:

Garlic, cultivated forms of Allium sativum with white bulbs
Allium neapolitanum, a wild plant native to the Mediterranean and Middle East